G. G. Allen Steam Station is a 1.140 GW coal-fired electricity generating facility, located in South Point Township, Gaston County, North Carolina, on man-made Lake Wylie (part of the Catawba River). Units 1 and 2 (165 MW each) began operating in 1957; units 3, 4, and 5 (275 MW each) in 1959, 1960, and 1961 respectively. Named for George Garland Allen, a former president and first chairman of the board for Duke Power, the Allen facility is the only Duke Energy station with five units under one roof. The plant is equipped with a flue-gas desulfurization  system, completed in 2009, that decreases the air emissions coming from the plant. In February 2021, Duke Energy in a filing to the North Carolina Utilities Commission advanced their planned closure for Unit 3 from December 31, 2021 to March 31, 2021.

Environmental impact
G. G. Allen Steam Station is still a major air and water polluter in the region.

1995–2001 data

See also

 List of power stations
 Global warming

References

External links
 Allen Steam Station, Duke Energy website.

1957 establishments in North Carolina
Energy infrastructure completed in 1957
Energy infrastructure completed in 1959
Energy infrastructure completed in 1960
Energy infrastructure completed in 1961
Coal-fired power stations in North Carolina
Buildings and structures in Gaston County, North Carolina
Duke Energy